General elections were held in India between 16 and 20 March 1977 to elect the members of the 6th Lok Sabha. The elections took place during the Emergency period, which expired on 21 March 1977, shortly before the final results were announced.

The election resulted in a heavy defeat for the Indian National Congress (INC), with the incumbent Prime Minister and INC party leader Indira Gandhi losing her seat in Rae Bareli, while her son Sanjay lost his seat in Amethi. The call for restoration of democracy by revoking the Emergency is considered to be a major reason for the sweeping victory for the opposition Janata Alliance, whose leader Morarji Desai was sworn in as the fourth Prime Minister of India on 24 March. At 81, Desai became the oldest man to be elected Prime Minister of India.

Background
This sixth general elections, which were conducted for 542 seats in single-member constituencies, represented 27 Indian states and union territories. These 542 constituencies remained same until 2004 Indian general elections for the 14th Lok Sabha.

The Emergency declared by the Indira Gandhi led Congress government was the core issue in the 1977 elections. Civil liberties were suspended during the national emergency from 25 June 1975 to 21 March 1977 and Prime Minister Indira Gandhi assumed vast powers.

Gandhi had become extremely unpopular for her decision and paid for it during the elections. On 18 January, Gandhi called for fresh elections and released some political prisoners. Many remained in prison until she was ousted from office and a new prime minister took over. On 20 January, four opposition parties, the Indian National Congress (Organisation), the Bharatiya Jana Sangh, the Bharatiya Lok Dal and the Praja Socialist Party, decided to fight the elections under a single banner called the Janata alliance. The alliance used the symbol allocated to Bhartiya Lok Dal as their symbol on the ballot papers.

The Janata Alliance reminded voters of the excesses and human rights violations during the Emergency, like compulsory sterilisation and imprisonment of political leaders. The Janata campaign said the elections would decide whether India would have "democracy or dictatorship." The Congress looked jittery. Agriculture and Irrigation Minister Babu Jagjivan Ram quit the party in the first week of February; other notable Congress stalwarts who crossed the floor with Jagjivan Ram before the election were Hemvati Nandan Bahuguna and Nandini Satpathy.

Results

Voter behaviour
The elections in India's largest state Uttar Pradesh, historically a Congress stronghold, turned against Gandhi. Dhanagare says the structural reasons included the emergence of a strong and united opposition, disunity and weariness within the Congress, an effective opposition and the failure of Gandhi in controlling the mass media, which was under censorship during the Emergency. The structural factors allowed voters to express their grievances, notably their resentment of the emergency and its authoritarian and repressive policies. One grievance often mentioned was the 'Nasbandi' (vasectomy) campaign in rural areas. The middle class also emphasised on the curbing of freedom of speech throughout the country.

Meanwhile, Congress hit an all-time low in West Bengal, according to the Gangulys, because of poor discipline and factionalism among Congress activists as well as numerous defections that weakened the party. Opponents emphasised the issues of corruption within the Congress and appealed to a deep desire by the voters for fresh leadership. The Congress, however, did well in southern states of Tamil Nadu, Karnataka, Kerala and Andhra Pradesh. The results were mixed in the western states of Maharashtra and Gujarat, although the Janata alliance won all the seats in Mumbai.

See also
Election Commission of India
1974 Indian presidential election

References

Further reading
Guha, Ramachandra. India After Gandhi: The History of the World's Largest Democracy (2008)  pp 491–518
Klieman, Aaron S. "Indira's India: Democracy and Crisis Government," Political Science Quarterly (1981) 96#2 pp. 241–259 in JSTOR
Roy, Ramashray; Sheth, D. L. "The 1977 Lok Sabha Election Outcome: The Salience of Changing Voter Alignments Since 1969," Political Science Review (1978), Vol. 17 Issue 3/4, pp 51–63

 
March 1977 events in Asia
India
General elections in India